Alexander Bonner Latta  (June 11, 1821 – April 28, 1865) was an American manufacturer and inventor. He specialized in engines that used steam for power. He designed railroad steam locomotives and directed the construction of the first such locomotive built west of the Alleghany Mountains. An unusual train locomotive design he innovated was one that had an additional set of cylinders that utilized steam exhaust for more power. He designed and constructed the first efficiently working steam fire engine to be routinely used as a part of a city's fire-fighting equipment. The fire engine was first adopted by Cincinnati, Boston, and New York City. He invented a self-propelled steam-engine fire engine.

Early life 
Latta was born on a farm just outside the city limits of Chillicothe, Ohio, on July 11, 1821. He was the youngest of six children and went by the nickname "Moses". When he was five years old, his father, John Latta, was killed in an accident. This left his mother, Rebecca Latta, a penniless widow. Latta soon started his schooling and attended a country school in Ohio until he was thirteen years old, when he was forced to quit school to help support his family. Latta's first jobs were at David Bradford Woolen Mills, for seventy-five cents per week; at a shipyard, three years later, starting at three dollars per week, later raised to nine dollars; at Samuel Cummings' brass foundry, three years later; and at William Bylad's machine shop, around 1840, Latta having become an experienced mechanic. In the early 1840s, his mother moved the family to Cincinnati to take advantage of better financial opportunities there to get skilled jobs for her sons.

Mid life and career 

In 1841, Latta met Anthony Harkness while on a business trip to Washington, D. C. Harkness was the owner of a machine shop and foundry in Cincinnati.  Latta demonstrated his mechanical ability to Harkness and explained his invention for a machine that produce parts for steamboat paddle wheels. He made such an impact on Harkness that he was offered a job as superintendent of Harkness's foundry. His first assignment was that of designing a huge lathe planing machine. George Escol Sellers, an inventor, believed the machine Latta made was a mechanical masterpiece.

Latta first became a foreman at the Harkness machine shop and later became an engineer. In 1845, he directed the construction of the first railroad locomotive built west of the Alleghany Mountains, and served as the locomotive's engineer when it made its trial run, from Cincinnati to Columbus, Ohio and back. In 1846, Latta designed an unusual train locomotive for the Boston and Maine Railroad. The locomotive had an additional set of cylinders, under the water tank, which utilized the residual energy of steam exhaust sent back through specially designed pipes from the primary cylinders.

In 1846, Latta formed the Buckeye Works company with his brothers Edmundson and Finlay. In 1852 he built a steam fire engine with Abel Shawk. In 1856 he induced the Boston Locomotive Works to build a coal burning locomotive from his design. This engine was a total failure, however the boiler was ultimately used as stationary boiler at the builder's shop. In 1857 Latta published a catalog showing several improvements for locomotives. One design permitted a more widespread distribution of the engine's weight and dead weight of the tender for traction.

Uncle Joe Ross and Citizen's Gift steam fire engines 

Latta's greatest inventions were those related to steam-powered fire engines. Beginning in March 1852, he designed and manufactured the world's first functional steam fire engine, which could be drawn by both men and horses and could be used by city fire departments as part of their standard fire-fighting equipment. The fire engine was given the label Uncle Joe Ross after Joseph Ross, the city councilman who promoted it, and was put into full service at the fire department in Cincinnati on January 1, 1853.

In April 1853, the Cincinnati volunteer fire department was reorganized around the use of Latta's steam fire engine, and became the first paid company of firemen. The city then ordered two more of Latta's steam fire engines for $9,500 each, and they were built and delivered by December 30. The new fire engines were named Citizen's Gift and A. B. Latta. The Citizens' Gift was named for the citizens of Cincinnati, whose donations paid for the fire engine. In 1855, Boston was next to adopt Latta's steam fire engine. Theirs was the first American fire department to change entirely from hand operated to steam powered fire engines. Boston was followed by New York City, and then other cities.

Cincinnati's Uncle Joe Ross fire engine was demonstrated to a group of men from Chicago on December 5, 1855. People were concerned about the extreme high pressure the engine developed and warned the operating engineer. At the point of maximum pressure a hose burst. Finally, the engineer turned off the engine, but just as the engine stopped it exploded. This was the first steam fire engine explosion. It killed the operating engineer and injured several people.

A self-propelled steam-engine patent was granted to Latta in 1855. The steam engine rode on three steel wheels arranged as a tricycle's. The front wheel was for steering and the back wheels not only propelled the machine down the streets, but powered the pumps that pushed the water through hoses onto the flames. The boiler consisted of two square chambers, one within the other. The space between them contained water that was heated to steam by the inner-chamber firebox.

Later life and death 

Latta's last design was for a "steam dummy" for the street railway in the city of Cincinnati. It consisted of a 6-horsepower portable engine, of his design, that was built into a street railway car. It was tested in March 1860. Between 1847 and his death, Latta received patents for several improvements to steam locomotives and fire engines. Latta retired in 1862 and died in Ludlow, Kentucky, in 1865.

Family 
Latta married Elizabeth Ann Pawson on October 21, 1847. They had two children who grew to adulthood, G. Taylor and Luella M. Latta.

Awards 
Latta invented a series of improvements to railroad applications, but only a few of his patented inventions were actually used in the industry. He received a gold medal for fire engine improvements at the Ohio Mechanics' Institute Fair in 1854.

References

Sources

External links
 

1821 births
1865 deaths
Engineers from Ohio
19th-century American inventors
American manufacturing businesspeople
American railroad pioneers
Businesspeople from Cincinnati
People from Chillicothe, Ohio
Fire service vehicle manufacturers
19th-century American businesspeople